Adam Bartley (born January 28, 1979) is an American actor. He is best known for his role as Sheriff's Deputy Archie "the Ferg" Ferguson on the television series Longmire.

Life and career
Bartley was born in Minnesota, and is a 1997 graduate of Eden Prairie High School in Eden Prairie.  In 2001, Bartley graduated from Southern Methodist University with a Bachelor of Fine Arts degree in acting.  While in college, he worked at Reunion Arena during Dallas Mavericks basketball games.

After college, he lived in New York City, Chicago, Aspen, and Alaska, and acted in local theater productions while working as an acting teacher and coach. After moving to Los Angeles, he was selected for his first television pilot audition; it was for Longmire, and he won the role. His other television credits include parts on Justified, Bones, NCIS: Los Angeles, American Housewife, Lucifer, This Is Us.

In 2022 Bartley had a recurring role on the Amazon Studios & Legendary Television sci-fi drama Night Sky. He has also appeared in several movies, including Kajillionaire, Vice, Donnybrook, Under the Silver Lake, Annabelle: Creation, and 2013's Armed Response.

Personal life
In April 2015, Bartley was arrested in Santa Fe, New Mexico and charged with driving under the influence.  Tests determined that his blood alcohol level was .09, just over the .08 legal limit.

Filmography

Film

Television

References

External links
 

1979 births
Living people
American male television actors
Southern Methodist University alumni
21st-century American male actors
Male actors from Minnesota